Mateusz Michalski (born 12 December 1988) is a Polish Paralympic swimmer. He won two bronze medals for swimming at the 2004 Summer Paralympics.

References 

1988 births
Living people
People from Knurów
Paralympic swimmers of Poland
Swimmers at the 2004 Summer Paralympics
Swimmers at the 2008 Summer Paralympics
Paralympic bronze medalists for Poland
Medalists at the 2004 Summer Paralympics
Paralympic medalists in swimming
Medalists at the World Para Swimming Championships
Polish male backstroke swimmers
Polish male breaststroke swimmers
S6-classified Paralympic swimmers

pl:Mateusz Michalski